Namaste Trump (stylised as नमस्ते TRUMP) was a tour event held on 24 and 25 February 2020 in India. It was the inaugural visit of the then US President Donald Trump and his family to India. A rally event of the same name was held in Ahmedabad, Gujarat, and was the highlight of the tour, as a response to the "Howdy Modi" event held in Houston, Texas, in September 2019. The Narendra Modi Stadium (then known as Motera Stadium) hosted US President Trump and his family along with Indian Prime Minister Narendra Modi. An attendance of over 100,000 people was reported, with some speculating an attendance as high as 125,000. The tour was originally named "Kem Chho Trump" but was renamed by the Government of India to promote Indian nationalism over regionalism.

Main event
The main event at the stadium was organised in the afternoon and was the highlight of the President's visit to India. The event served as a platform for the US President and Indian Prime Minister to display their friendly relationship with each other. While initial reports suggested that Trump would inaugurate the Motera Stadium, it was later disregarded as "speculation and assumption".

Taj Mahal visit

Trump also visited the Taj Mahal in Agra, Uttar Pradesh on the same day. In Agra, the Chief Minister of Uttar Pradesh, Yogi Adityanath welcomed the President and the First Lady on their arrival at Agra Airport. An exposition event with 3000 cultural artists showcasing the art and culture of various regions in India also took place. The Trump family then visited the Taj Mahal informally, with no official personnel except the tour guide, and protective personnel such as the United States Secret Service and India's National Security Guard.

Banquet and trade deals
After visiting the Taj Mahal, the President and his family headed towards New Delhi, to stay at the ITC Maurya, which was heavily surrounded by security personnel from both countries. They also attended the dinner banquet hosted by the President of India Ram Nath Kovind. The next day, the First Lady visited Sarvodaya Vidyalaya Senior Secondary Co-Educational school in Nanakpura, South Delhi. President Trump and Prime Minister Modi addressed common issues such as 5G connectivity, trade deals, and signed a US$3 billion defense deal.

Preparation
Ahead of Trump's visit to Ahmedabad, the Gujarat state government had built a new wall. The construction of this wall was protested by social workers claiming that it was created for hiding slums. However, officials denied this and said that it was built due to security reasons. In order to keep all roads and walls around the airport spotless from the "red liquid" spat out by the paan consumers during the Trump visit, the health department of the Ahmedabad Municipal Corporation sealed paan shops near the airport. The Uttar Pradesh government, too, cleaned up the city of Agra and released 500 cusecs of water into the Yamuna river to improve its "environmental condition" ahead of visit.

Reception

Trump's visit coincided with 2020 Delhi riots, with some Indian politicians and political commentators accusing the rioters of tarnishing the country's image, and some criticising the organisation of the event. The visit was criticised by the Indian National Congress, which is the main opposition to the ruling Bharatiya Janata Party. They claimed it to be "extravaganza" and advised the government to use this opportunity to discuss key issues. Further, the leader of the Congress, Priyanka Gandhi, demanded to know which government ministry was funding the private welcoming committee with the estimated amount of 100 crore for organising the Ahmedabad event. Earlier, India's Ministry of External Affairs had stated that a private organisation, Donald Trump Abhinandan Samiti, was responsible for organising the Ahmedabad event.

See also
 India–United States relations

References

External links
 

February 2020 events in India
Presidency of Donald Trump
India–United States relations
Foreign policy of the Narendra Modi administration
Articles containing video clips